Black Magic was a horror anthology comic book series published by American company Prize Comics from 1950 to 1961. The series was packaged by the creative duo Joe Simon and Jack Kirby, and featured non-gory horror content.

After 50 issues as Black Magic, the title's numbering continued for three more issues as the humor comic Cool Cat before being canceled.

DC reprint title 
In 1973–1975, DC Comics published a nine-issue series reprinting Simon–Kirby material from the earlier series. The new incarnation featured new covers with the same logo as the earlier issues of the Prize series. The reprint issues generally grouped the stories by theme; for example, all the stories in issue #1 dealt with intolerance toward human oddities, while all the stories in #4 were about death.

References

External links 

Comics magazines published in the United States
Golden Age comics titles
Crestwood Publications titles
DC Comics titles
Horror comics
Fantasy comics
1950 comics debuts
1961 comics endings
1973 comics debuts
1975 comics endings
Magazines established in 1950
Magazines disestablished in 1961
Magazines established in 1973
Magazines disestablished in 1975
1950 establishments in the United States
1961 disestablishments in the United States
1973 establishments in the United States
1975 disestablishments in the United States